Dyer County is a county located in the westernmost part of the U.S. state of Tennessee. As of the 2020 census, the population was 36,801. The county seat is Dyersburg. Dyer County comprises the Dyersburg, TN Micropolitan Statistical Area.

History

19th century
Dyer County was founded by a Private Act of Tennessee, passed on October 16, 1823.  The area was part of the territory in Tennessee that was previously legally recognized as belonging to the Chickasaw Native Americans as "Indian Lands".

The county was named for Robert Henry Dyer (circa 1774–1826). Dyer had been an army officer in the Creek War and War of 1812, and a cavalry colonel in the First Seminole War of 1818 before becoming a state senator. He was instrumental in the formation of the counties of Dyer and Madison County, Tennessee.

Around 1823, Louis Philippe I stopped briefly near the mouth of the Obion River and killed a bald eagle.

In 1869, three, possibly five, white men were lynched under suspicion of horse thievery.

In Mark Twain's Life on the Mississippi, Twain reported seeing a steamboat at the mouth of the Obion River bearing his name. He notes this is the first time he encountered something named after him.

20th century
On February 1, 1916, a black man named Julius Morgan was accused of raping a white woman in Dyer County. In order to avoid a lynching at the hands of a local mob, Sheriff C.C. Dawson had Morgan sent to the jail in Jackson for safety, and again to jails in Union City and Nashville.  His attorneys were able to secure a change in venue to Memphis for his trial. He was convicted and sentenced to death. On July 13, 1916, Morgan was the first person to be executed by electrocution in Tennessee.

21st century

On April 2, 2006 a severe weather system passed through Dyer County, producing tornadoes that killed 16 in the county and 24 in Tennessee.

Geography

The county is drained by the Mississippi River, which forms its western boundary. The confluences of the Forked Deer River into the Obion River, and the Obion into the Mississippi are located in the county.  It is in the part of Tennessee called the "Mississippi bottomland" or the Mississippi Alluvial Valley.

Dyer County is bisected by U.S. Route 51, the older major highway connecting Memphis with Chicago from south to north. When upgraded to interstate standards, this road will become Interstate 69.  To the west, Dyer County is connected to Missouri by Interstate 155 over the Mississippi River, providing the only highway connection, other than those at Memphis, between Tennessee and the states to the west of the river.

Adjacent counties
Lake County (north)
Obion County (northeast)
Gibson County (east)
Crockett County (southeast)
Lauderdale County (south)
Mississippi County, Arkansas (southwest)
Pemiscot County, Missouri (northwest)

Major highways

Demographics

2020 census

As of the 2020 United States census, there were 36,801 people, 15,120 households, and 10,566 families residing in the county.

2000 census
As of the census of 2000, there were 37,279 people, 14,751 households, and 10,458 families residing in the county.  The population density was 73 people per square mile (28/km2).  There were 16,123 housing units at an average density of 32 per square mile (12/km2).  The racial makeup of the county was 85.40% White, 12.86% Black or African American, 0.22% Native American, 0.33% Asian, 0.02% Pacific Islander, 0.43% from other races, and 0.73% from two or more races.  1.16% of the population were Hispanic or Latino of any race.

There were 14,751 households, out of which 32.90% had children under the age of 18 living with them, 53.20% were married couples living together, 13.60% had a female householder with no husband present, and 29.10% were non-families. 25.30% of all households were made up of individuals, and 10.70% had someone living alone who was 65 years of age or older.  The average household size was 2.49 and the average family size was 2.97.

In the county, the age distribution of the population shows 25.70% under the age of 18, 8.70% from 18 to 24, 28.60% from 25 to 44, 23.50% from 45 to 64, and 13.40% who were 65 years of age or older.  The median age was 36 years. For every 100 females there were 92.00 males.  For every 100 females age 18 and over, there were 88.80 males.

The median income for a household in the county was $32,788, and the median income for a family was $39,848. Males had a median income of $31,182 versus $21,605 for females. The per capita income for the county was $16,451.  About 13.00% of families and 15.90% of the population were below the poverty line, including 21.00% of those under age 18 and 17.60% of those age 65 or over.

Education
 Dyersburg State Community College - established 1969.
 Tennessee College of Applied Technology - Northwest - located in Newbern, established 1965.

Media

Newspapers
State Gazette – 3 days/week (Sunday, Tuesday, Thursday); general news. The paper has served Dyersburg and Northwest Tennessee since 1865.

Communities

City
Dyersburg (county seat)

Towns
Newbern
Trimble (partly in Obion County)

Census-designated places

 Bogota
 Finley
 Fowlkes
 Lenox
 Miston

Other unincorporated communities

 Beech Grove
 Big Boy Junction
 Bonicord
 Boothspoint
 Hawkinsville
 Midway
 Nauvoo
 RoEllen
 Tiger Tail
 Tigrett

Politics
Like most of the rural South, Dyer County is presently overwhelmingly Republican. The last Democrat to carry this county was Bill Clinton in 1996. Being overwhelmingly secessionist during the Civil War due to the strong power of the slave economy in West Tennessee, Dyer County was overwhelmingly Democratic for a century after its blacks were disfranchised. Anti-Catholicism allowed Richard Nixon to carry the county narrowly in 1960, then after the massive revolt against the Civil Rights Act and race riots segregationist Alabama Governor George Wallace carried the county in 1968 and Nixon defeated George McGovern three-to-one in 1972. Since then the county has become increasingly Republican except when Southerners Jimmy Carter and Clinton headed the presidential ticket.

See also
National Register of Historic Places listings in Dyer County, Tennessee

References

External links

 Dyersburg-Dyer County Chamber of Commerce
 Dyer County Schools
 Dyer County, TNGenWeb – genealogy resources

 
1823 establishments in Tennessee
Populated places established in 1823
Tennessee counties on the Mississippi River
Second Amendment sanctuaries in Tennessee
West Tennessee